In mathematics, a matrix polynomial is a polynomial with square matrices as variables. Given an ordinary, scalar-valued polynomial
 
this polynomial evaluated at a matrix A is

where I is the identity matrix.

A matrix polynomial equation is an equality between two matrix polynomials, which holds for the specific matrices in question.  A matrix polynomial identity is a matrix polynomial equation which holds for all matrices A in a specified matrix ring Mn(R).

Characteristic and minimal polynomial 

The Cayley–Hamilton theorem states that if this polynomial is viewed as a matrix polynomial and evaluated at the matrix A itself, the result is the zero matrix: . The characteristic polynomial is thus a polynomial which annihilates A. 

There is a unique monic polynomial of minimal degree which annihilates A; this polynomial is the minimal polynomial. Any polynomial which annihilates A (such as the characteristic polynomial) is a multiple of the minimal polynomial.

It follows that given two polynomials P and Q, we have  if and only if 

Matrix geometrical series

Matrix polynomials can be used to sum a matrix geometrical series as one would an ordinary geometric series,

If I − A is nonsingular one can evaluate the expression for the sum S.

See also
Latimer–MacDuffee theorem
Matrix exponential
Matrix function

Notes

References
 
 .
 .

Matrix theory
Polynomials